Sean Finn is a German DJ from Stuttgart.

Early life and career
Finn started DJing at a club in Germany called M1. Having performed alongside DJs such as Eric Prydz, Benny Benassi and Sebastian Ingrosso, Finn played a significant part in the "House Boom".

Discography

Charted singles

References

Living people
German DJs
House DJs
German house musicians
German electronic musicians
Electronic dance music DJs
Year of birth missing (living people)